The following is a list of notable deaths in April 2004'.

Entries for each day are listed alphabetically by surname. A typical entry lists information in the following sequence:
 Name, age, country of citizenship at birth, subsequent country of citizenship (if applicable), reason for notability, cause of death (if known), and reference.

April 2004

1
Paul Atkinson, 58, British guitarist.
Aaron Bank, 101, American U.S. Army officer, "Father of Special Forces".
Annette Daniels, 42, American opera singer.
Enrique Grau, 83, Colombian painter and sculptor.
Arthur Halestrap, 105, British World War I soldier and centenarian.
Sylvia Law, 73, British town planner.
Mykola Rudenko, 83, Ukrainian poet and human rights activist.
Charles St Clair, 17th Lord Sinclair, 89, British aristocrat and courtier.
Gurcharan Singh Tohra, 79, Indian Sikh leader.
Carrie Snodgress, 58, American actress (Diary of a Mad Housewife, Pale Rider, Murphy's Law).

2
John Argyris, 90, Greek computer scientist.
Lynne Karen Deutsch, 47, American astrophysicist.
Harold A. Fidler, 93, Associate Director of the Lawrence Radiation Laboratory.
Larry McGrew, 46, American football linebacker in the National Football League, heart attack.
John Taras, 84, American ballet master and choreographer.

3
John Diamond, Baron Diamond, 96, British life peer.
Gabriella Ferri, 62, Italian singer.
Sir Martin Le Quesne, 86, British diplomat.
Nagaraja Rao, 89-90, Indian cricket umpire.
Phillip Rock, 76, American actor, screenwriter (Most Dangerous Man Alive) and novelist ("Passing Bells" trilogy).

4
Gito Baloi, 39, South African musician.
George Bamberger, 80, American baseball player, major league pitcher and manager.
Ralph Kemplen, 91, British film editor (The Day of the Jackal, The African Queen, The Dark Crystal).
James J. Martin, 87, American historian.
Bogdan Norčič, 50, Yugoslavian Olympic ski jumper (normal hill and large hill ski jumping at the 1976 and 1980 Winter Olympics).
Sir Alwyn Williams, 82, British geologist.
Austin Willis, 87, Canadian actor and television host.

5
Roger Dee, 89, American author.
Slawomir Rawicz, 88, Polish army lieutenant imprisoned by the NKVD and purported escapee (The Long Walk: The True Story of a Trek to Freedom).
Fred Winter, 77, British racehorse trainer and jockey.

6
Lou Berberet, 74, American baseball player, former Major League Baseball catcher.
Larisa Bogoraz, 74, Russian dissident and human rights activist.
Ken Johnson, 81, American baseball player (St. Louis Cardinals, Philadelphia Phillies, Detroit Tigers).

7
Victor Argo, 69, American actor (King of New York, Taxi Driver, Bad Lieutenant), complications from lung cancer.
Konstantinos Kallias, 102, Greek politician.
Kelucharan Mohapatra, 77, Indian classical dancer, guru and proponent of Odissi dance.
Maureen Potter, 79, Irish actress, singer, dancer and comedian.
Robert Sangster, 67, British racehorse owner.

8
Adrian Beers, 88, British double bass player.
Chief Bey, 90, American jazz percussionist and African folklorist.
Bruce Edwards, 49, American caddy of golfer Tom Watson.
Jean Ginsburg, 77, English physician and physiologist.
Hans Guido Mutke, 83, German fighter pilot who claimed to be the first to break the sound barrier, complications during a heart valve operation.

9
Lélia Abramo, 93, Brazilian actress and political activist, one of the founders of President Lula da Silva's Workers Party.
Harry Babbitt, 90, American singer.
Kevin Briggs, 65, New Zealand cricketer.
Tom Lewis, 85, British obstetrician.
Julius Sang, 55, Kenyan Olympic runner (1968 Summer Olympics, 1972 Summer Olympics: gold medal, bronze medal).
Jirí Weiss, 91, Czech film director, screenwriter, writer, and playwright.

10
Bertil Göransson, 85, Swedish rowing coxswain.
Jacek Kaczmarski, 47, Polish poet and singer, the bard of Solidarity.
Ben Pimlott, 58, British historian.
Sakip Sabanci, 71, Turkish businessman.
Odd Wang Sørensen, 81, Norwegian Olympic football player (men's football at the 1952 Summer Olympics).

11
John Beaven, 73, British diplomat.
Stan Darling, 92, Canadian politician.
Sammy Fox, 85, American football player and Canadian football coach.
Hy Gotkin, 81, American basketball player.
David C. Pollock, 64, American sociologist and author.
Wiesław Ptak, 62, Polish professor of chemical sciences.

12
Ronnie Adams, 88, British rally driver.
Norman Campbell, 80, Canadian composer, television producer and director.
Sir Herbert Durkin, 82, British air marshal.
Donal F. Early, 86, Irish psychiatrist.
Carlton E. Lemke, 83, American mathematician.
Robert Richardson, 76, Canadian Olympic alpine skier (men's downhill, men's giant slalom, men's slalom at the 1952 Winter Olympics).
Frank Seward, 83, American baseball player (New York Giants).
Juan Valderrama, 87, Spanish folk and flamenco singer.
Wesley Wehr, 74, American paleontologist and artist.
George W. Whitehead, 85, American mathematician.

13
David Fowler, 66, British mathematician.
Csaba Horváth, 74, Hungarian-born American chemical engineer and scientist.
Caron Keating, 41, British television presenter, breast cancer.
Sir John Roxburgh, 84, British admiral.

14
Harry Beevers, 80, American plant physiologist.
Micheline Charest, 51, British television producer, complications after plastic surgery.
Albie Grant, 60, American college basketball player, diabetes.
Robin Popplestone, 65, British software designer and a pioneer in artificial intelligence and robotics.
Fabrizio Quattrocchi, 35, Italian security officer, killed by Islamist militants in Iraq.

15
Hans Gmür, 77, Swiss theatre author, director, composer and producer.
Phil Sokolof, 82, American businessman known for campaigns against fast-food chains and food processors.
Mitsuteru Yokoyama, 69, Japanese manga artist.

16
Abu al-Walid, Saudi Arabian terrorist, killed by Russian federal forces.
Carlos Castaño Gil, 38, Colombian rebel leader, killed by FARC guerillas.
Wilmot N. Hess, 77, American physicist, leukemia.
Koyapillil Mathai Matthew, 74, Indian Jesuit priest and botanist.
Harry Mayerovitch, 94, Canadian architect, artist, illustrator, and author.

17
Bruce Boa, 73, Canadian-British actor (The Empire Strikes Back, Octopussy, Full Metal Jacket), cancer.
Anke Hartnagel, 62, German politician, Member of the German Bundestag (1998–2004).
Geraint Howells, 79, Welsh politician.
Rosemary Park, 97, American academic leader and advocate for women's education.
Edmond Pidoux, 95, Swiss author.
Abdel Aziz al-Rantisi, 56, Palestinian Hamas leader.
Soundarya, 31, Indian film actress.

18
Ratu Sir Kamisese Mara, 83, Fijian politician, long-time prime minister and president of Fiji.
Norton Mockridge, 88, American journalist, newspaper editor and syndicated columnist.
Julia Compton Moore, 75, wife of Lieutenant General (Ret.) Hal Moore.
Frances Rafferty, 81, American actress, dancer, and model.

19
Tim Burstall, 76, Australian film director and producer.
Jim Cantalupo, 60, American businessman, CEO of McDonald's.
Julião da Kutonda, 39, Angolan footballer.
Philip Locke, 76, British actor.
John Maynard Smith, 84, British biologist.
Norris McWhirter, 78, British writer, political activist and founder of the Guinness Book of Records.
Frank B. Morrison, 98, American politician, former Governor of Nebraska.
Sam Nahem, 88, American baseball player (Brooklyn Dodgers, St. Louis Cardinals, Philadelphia Phillies).
Yasumasa Nishino, 79, Japanese Olympic swimmer (men's 100 metre backstroke at the 1952 Summer Olympics).
Ronnie Simpson, 73, Scottish footballer and manager.
Wolfgang Unger, 55, German conductor

20
Patrick Gibson, Baron Gibson, 88, British peer, publisher and arts administrator.
Mary McGrory, 85, American journalist and columnist.
Ian Robinson, 69, British writer and publisher.
Al Stiller, 80, American Olympic cyclist (men's tandem cycling and men's team pursuit cycling at the 1948 Summer Olympics).

21
Eduard Asadov, 80, Russian poet and writer.
Den Fujita, 78, Japanese founder of McDonald's Japan, heart failure.
Karl Hass, 91, German SS officer and convicted war criminal.
John W. Kirklin, 87, American cardiothoracic surgeon who  refined John Gibbon's heart–lung bypass machine.
Ernest Ramme, 87, U.S. Army officer.
Mary Selway, 68, British casting director (Raiders of the Lost Ark, Return of the Jedi, Gosford Park''), cancer.

22
Jason Dunham, 22, American marine, used his body and helmet to shield others from a grenade explosion.
Arthur Roberts, 91, American physicist.
Pat Tillman, 27, American football player, former NFL player (Arizona Cardinals) and Army Ranger, killed in action by friendly fire.

23
Enrique Mederos, 36, Mexican voice actor and dubbing director, hepatitis infection.
Saúl Ongaro, 87, Argentine international footballer.
Peter S. Prescott, 68, American author and book critic, liver disease complicated by diabetes.
Len Vale-Onslow, 103, British motorcycle maker.
B. V. Satyanarayan, 68, Indian Olympic long jumper (1960, 1964).

24
Betty Clay, 87, British Scouter, daughter of Robert Baden-Powell.
Feridun Karakaya, 76, Turkish actor.
Lia Laats, 78, Estonian actress.
Estée Lauder, 97, American businesswoman, cosmetics products pioneer.
Brian Manning, 76, British historian.
Fred Smith, 69, British rugby league player.
J. V. Somayajulu, 75, Indian theatre and film actor.
Des Warren, 66, British trade unionist.
Willie Watson, 84, English cricketer.

25
Alphonzo E. Bell Jr., 89, American politician, pneumonia.
Dooland Buultjens, 70, Sri Lankan cricket umpire.
Thom Gunn, 74, British poet.
Madeleine Henrey, 97, French author.
Hiroshi Mitsuzuka, 76, Japanese politician.
Albert Paulsen, 78, Ecuadorian-American actor.
Sid Watson, 71, American football player and ice hockey coach, heart attack.
Claude Williams, 96, American jazz musician.

26
Robert Clark Jones, 87, American physicist.
LeRoy Myers, 84, American tap dancer.
John Anthony Parsons, 66, British sports journalist.
Gunther E. Rothenberg, 80, German-born American historian.
Hubert Selby Jr., 75, American writer, author of "Last Exit to Brooklyn".
Scott Williams, American bass guitarist.

27
Gleason Archer, 87, American theologian.
David Jenkinson, 69, British railway modeller and historian.
Alejandro Ulloa, 93, Spanish actor.
Roy Walford, 79, American dietician and author.
Lloyd F. Wheat, 81, American lawyer and politician.

28
Jeremy Black, 52, British assyriologist.
Floyd Giebell, 94, American baseball player (Detroit Tigers).
Alex Randolph, 81, American designer of board games (TwixT, Enchanted Forest, Inkognito, Ricochet Robot).
B.J. Schramm, 65, American businessman and aircraft developer.

29
John Henniker-Major, 8th Baron Henniker, 88, British diplomat and aristocrat.
Nick Joaquin, 86, Filipino writer and national artist.
David S. Sheridan, 95, American inventor of disposable plastic endotracheal tube.
Sid Smith, 78, Canadian professional ice hockey player (Toronto Maple Leafs).
Svend Aage Holm Sørensen, 91, Danish Olympic rower (men's coxed four rowing at the 1936 Summer Olympics).

30
Heather Brigstocke, Baroness Brigstocke, 74, British educator and life peer.
Jeff Butterfield, 74, English rugby union player.
Jeffrey Alan Gray, 69, British psychiatrist.
Evelyn Mase, 81, South African nurse, first wife of Nelson Mandela.
Boris Pergamenschikow, 55, Russian cellist.
Kazimierz Plater, 89, Polish chess International Master, three-time Polish chess champion (1949, 1956, 1957).
Kioumars Saberi Foumani, (aka Gol-Agha), 62, Iranian satirist.

References 

2004-04
 04